Live in the UK 2008 is a live album by American rock band Paramore. The album is limited edition, with only a small number released featuring 3 live performances in Manchester, Brixton and Birmingham. Only 1000 copies of this release were made. Originally, there was going to be an option at each of the concerts to choose which live album could be bought. This was changed to only the Manchester live album being available at each of the dates. Brixton and Birmingham live albums had to be bought by February 5.

Fans could either pre-order the album online via Concert Live or buy the album at the concert itself. There was an option to buy the album by itself, or to buy it with the re-release of the "Misery Business" single in the UK. The first 200 who pre-ordered the album with the singles online received a signed version of the "Misery Business" single, while buying the singles at a concert meant each person had a 1 in 5 chance of receiving a signed copy.

This was released on 2 CD-Rs, the discs being professionally burned the same day and could be later picked up at the same venue, around 15 minutes after the end of the gig - The jackets were already printed earlier.

Track listing

References

Paramore live albums
2008 live albums
Fueled by Ramen live albums